Gargas is the name of several communes in France:

 Gargas, Haute-Garonne, in the Haute-Garonne department
 Gargas, Vaucluse, in the Vaucluse department
 Ocriers Gargas XIII, a rugby league club
 Caves of Gargas, a prehistoric site located in Aventignan, Hautes-Pyrénées

See also
 Garga (disambiguation)